Studenets is a rural locality (a village) in Rostilovskoye Rural Settlement, Gryazovetsky District, Vologda Oblast, Russia. The population was 20 as of 2002.

Geography 
Studenets is located 13 km south of Gryazovets (the district's administrative centre) by road. Bolshoye Kosikovo is the nearest rural locality.

References 

Rural localities in Gryazovetsky District